Adyghe is a language of the Northwest Caucasian family which, like the other Northwest Caucasian languages, is very rich in consonants, featuring many labialized and ejective consonants. Adyghe is phonologically more complex than Kabardian, having the retroflex consonants and their labialized forms.

Consonants
Adyghe exhibits a large number of consonants: between 50 and 60 consonants in the various Adyghe dialects. Below is the IPA phoneme chart of the consonant phonemes of Adyghe.

 In the Black Sea coast dialects of Adyghe (e.g. For example, the Shapsug words ""  "shirt", ""  "chicken" and ""   "rope" are pronounced in other dialects as "" , ""  and "" .
 In the Black Sea coast dialects of Adyghe (e.g. For example, the Shapsug words ""  "name" and ""  "lie" are pronounced in other dialects as ""  and "" .
 The phoneme written  is pronounced as a voiced alveolar lateral fricative  mostly by the Circassians of Adygea, but many Circassians in diaspora pronounce it as an alveolar lateral approximant .
For example, the words:
 "I carried him to" →  [sət͡ʃaːʁ]
 "I knew": →  [sət͡ʂʼaːʁ]
 "I don't know": →  [sət͡ʂʼɐrɐp]
 "I thought" →  [sət͡ʂʷʼɐʃʼəʁ]
 "you (pl.) knew" →  [ʃʷt͡ʂʼaːʁ].
For example:
 "I made him go" →  [zʁɐkʷʼaːʁ]
 "we made him go" →  [dʁɐkʷʼaːʁ]
 "you made him go" →  [bʁɐkʷʼaːʁ]
 "you (pl.) made him go" →  [ʒʷʁɐkʷʼaːʁ].
 The phoneme   found in the Adyghe dialects correspond to [xʷ]  in Kabardian. For example:
 [tfə] "five" ↔  [txʷə]
 [fəʑə] "white" ↔  [xʷəʑ]
 [t͡sʼəfə] "person" ↔  [t͡sʼəxʷ].
 In many Adyghe dialects (e.g. Bzhedug, Shapsug, Natukhia and Abzakh) there exist [t͡ɕʷ]  that corresponds to standard Temirgoy [t͡sʷ] . For example, the Temirgoy word цуакъэ [t͡sʷaːqɐ] is  [t͡ɕʷaːqɐ] in the other Adyghe dialects.
 All dialects possess a contrast between plain and labialized glottal stops. A very unusual minimal contrast, and possibly unique to the Abzakh dialect of Adyghe, is a three-way contrast between plain, labialized and palatalized glottal stops.
 The Black Sea dialect of Adyghe contains a very uncommon sound: a bidental fricative , which corresponds to the voiceless velar fricative  found in other varieties of Adyghe.

Vowels 
In contrast to its large consonant inventory, Adyghe has only three phonemic vowels in a classic vertical vowel system.  and  have varying allophones, whereas  has a more limited set. Realization of vocalic allophones is based on the surrounding consonants.

 When  are surrounded by a plain and a posterior consonant, they are backed only in the CVC environment.:22

Stress 
Stress in Adyghe is phonemic, in that it is unpredictable. The lexical stress tends to fall on one of two last syllables of the word stem. Longer words can also have multiple stress patterns, as in below: 
 Orthography / Transliteration:  / 
 Stress 1:     / 
 Stress 2:     / 
 Stress 3:     / 
 Stress 4:     / 
 Stress 5:     / 
 Blue: Primary stress
 Green: Secondary stress

However, the functional load of stress is extremely low, but yet there are pairs that differ optionally.

References 

Adyghe language
Northwest Caucasian phonologies